Judges for Democracy (JpD) is one of the five Spanish professional associations of judges and magistrates. It was founded by Juan Alberto Belloch. Since judges and magistrates in Spain are barred from joining class trade unions, professional associations are intended to protect the rights and interests of judges and magistrates. JpD is considered to be the third association by size and ideologically progressive.

See also
 Spanish Judiciary
 General Council of the Judicial Power of Spain
 Professional Association of Magistrates
 Francisco de Vitoria Association

References

External links
 Official Site

Trade unions in Spain
Law of Spain